The Rio Grande Pacific Corporation is a railroad holding company. Rio Grande Pacific Corporation plans, designs, implements, manages and operates short line railroads in the United States. The company was founded in 1986 with railroads in six states. 

It owns four railroads:
Idaho Northern and Pacific Railroad
Nebraska Central Railroad
New Orleans and Gulf Coast Railway
Wichita, Tillman and Jackson Railway

 the company provides dispatching on ten short line railroads, including for the Denton County Transportation Authority A-train commuter rail.

References

External links
Rio Grande Pacific Corporation

United States railroad holding companies
Railway companies established in 1986
American companies established in 1986